The 2023 Campeonato Catarinense (officially the Catarinense Fort Atacadista 2023 for sponsorship reasons) is the 98th season of Santa Catarina's top-flight football league organized by FCF. The season began on 14 January and will end on 8 April 2023. Brusque are the defending champions.

Format
The tournament will be contested between 12 teams, who first will play in a single round-robin tournament. In the first stage, the bottom two teams will be relegated to the 2024 Série B. The final stage will be played on a home-and-away two-legged basis. Champions and runners-up will qualify for the 2024 Copa do Brasil, while three teams will qualify for the 2024 Campeonato Brasileiro Série D.

Participating teams

First stage

Table and Results

Final stage
Starting from the quarter-finals, the teams played a single-elimination tournament. The matches will be played on a home-and-away two-legged basis, with the higher-seeded team hosting the second leg. If tied on aggregate, the penalty shoot-out will be used to determine the winners.

Bracket

Quarter-finals

|}

Group A

Winners qualify for the semi-finals.

Group B

Winners qualify for the semi-finals.

Group C

Winners qualify for the semi-finals.

Group D

Winners qualify for the semi-finals.

Semi-finals

|}

Group E

Winners qualify for the finals.

Group F

Winners qualify for the finals.

Finals

|}

Group G

Top goalscorers

References

Campeonato Catarinense seasons
Catarinense
2023 in Brazilian football